Paulus de Roo ( – 9 August 1695) was a Governor of Dutch Ceylon during the Dutch period in Ceylon.

De Roo was appointed acting governor on 29 January 1695, and remained at his post until 9 August.

Footnotes 

1658 births
1695 deaths
17th-century Dutch colonial governors
Governors of Dutch Ceylon
Dutch East India Company people
People from Surat
Dutch India
Dutch expatriates in India